The  is a multi-use stadium in Machida, Tokyo, Japan. It is currently used mostly for football matches and also sometimes for rugby union and athletics events. This stadium has a seating capacity of 15,489.

Gallery

References

External links
 Official website 

Athletics (track and field) venues in Japan
Football venues in Japan
Sports venues in Tokyo
FC Machida Zelvia
Machida, Tokyo
1990 establishments in Japan
Sports venues completed in 1990